Spiro Koleka (7 July 1908 – 22 August 2001) was an important Albanian statesman, communist politician and a high-ranking military officer during World War II. He was a civil engineer by profession. Spiro Koleka served as a parliament member in all legislatures from 1944 until 1990. Koleka was a member of the Politburo of the Party of Labor of Albania during the years 1948 to 1981. As part of his political career he also served as Chairman of the State Planning Commission, Minister of Industry and Construction of Albania, as well as Vice Prime Minister.

Ethnicity 
According to British academics James Pettifer and Miranda Vickers, Koleka was born into an ethnic Greek family and was one of the few members of the Greek minority serving in the Socialist People's Republic of Albania political system.  Spiro Koleka was a distant relative of Spiro Jorgo Koleka (1879 or 1880–1940), a leader of the Albanian national movement and later interwar government minister.

Edi Rama, a maternal descendant of the Koleka family, said that the family is from Mirdita, and that the surname was derived from Kol Leka.

Life and career 
Koleka was born in the village of Vuno, an Orthodox Albanian village part of Himara, a predominantly Greek speaking region.

After completing his secondary education in the Italo–Albanian college of San Demetrio Corone (Collegio of Sant'Adriano), in the Italian province of Cosenza, Spiro Koleka continued his higher education at the University of Pisa (1930–1934) where he graduated as a civil engineer. After his return to Albania, he was involved in anti-Zogist and anti-Italian activities; in 1935 he participated in the Fier rebellion against King Zog and shortly after found himself arrested by the authorities.

During 1937–39 Spiro Koleka travelled extensively in Italy while taking an active part in the resistance against the Italian occupation of Albania. Upon the Italian occupation (7 April 1939) he fled to Yugoslavia, but returned to Albania in December 1939. During 1940–41 he began cooperating with the communist resistance underground while at the same time co-founding and running the Mani and Koleka Engineering Company. Koleka was elected as a member of the General Council and of the General Staff of the Communist Party of Albania at the Labinot Conference (1943). In May 1944, he was appointed Minister of Public Works at the Pennet Conference, officially in October as part of the first of Hoxha's governments.

In October 1948 he became Minister of Communications, and then also President of the State Planning Commission in November 1948. He was a member of the Politburo. Koleka was part of the Trade Delegation's visit to Moscow in 1949. In November 1949 he became Deputy Prime Minister. In the capacity of Deputy Prime Minister, Koleka presented in 1952 the very first Five Year Plan for the economy.

Koleka was often accused by various members of the Greek minority for its role in the forced dislocation of their compatriots.

In 1966, he was again appointed chairman of the State Planning Commission.

Koleka's background and experience as a technocrat allowed him to lead numerous economic and political delegations of the time to many East European countries, including the Soviet Union. Moreover, he was reported by the national and international press to be the chief architect of Albanian industrial development which was the backbone of the program of the Albanian Workers' Party after the Second World War.

Political offices 
 Vice prime minister of the cabinet of Enver Hoxha from 1 November 1949 until 24 September 1953.
 Chairman of the State Planning Commission from 1 November 1949 until 5 July 1950.
 Minister of Industry and Construction of Albania from 24 July 1953 until 23 July 1954.
 Chairman of the State Planning Commission from 23 July 1954 until 21 June 1958.
 Vice prime minister of the cabinet of Mehmet Shehu from 4 July 1956 until 18 March 1966.
 Chairman of the State Planning Commission from 18 March 1966 until 1 March 1968.
 Vice prime minister of the cabinet of Mehmet Shehu from 1 November 1968 until 13 November 1976.

Awards 
 Albanian Medal of Freedom, First Class
 Yugoslav Partisan Star

References 

1908 births
2001 deaths
People from Himara
Albanian people of Greek descent
Labour Party of Albania politicians
Members of the Politburo of the Labour Party of Albania
Members of the Parliament of Albania
Government ministers of Albania
Deputy Prime Ministers of Albania
Industry and mines ministers of Albania
Public Works ministers of Albania
State auditors of Albania
Albanian engineers
20th-century engineers